Apricot Morning is the second album by Quantic, released on June 25, 2002.

Track listing
Apricot Morning – 6:26
Transatlantic – 4:43
Brand New Watusi (featuring EQ) – 6:01
Search the Heavens – 5:53
Wider than the Sky – 3:55
Primate Boogaloo (featuring Aspects) – 3:35
Blackstone Rock – 4:10
Sweet Calling (featuring Alice Russell) – 4:43
Trouble From The River – 6:26
Not So Blue – 5:07
Off the Beaten Track – 3:30

External links
Official album page
 [ Apricot Morning review] at Allmusic

2002 albums
Will Holland albums